Atherinomorus balabacensis is a species of Atheriniformes in the family Atherinidae.

References 

Atheriniformes
Animals described in 1910